Holmen is a village in La Crosse County, Wisconsin, United States. The population was 10,661 as of the census of 2020. It is part of the La Crosse-Onalaska, WI-MN Metropolitan Statistical Area.

History

Holmen was settled by Norwegian immigrants in 1862. It was incorporated as a village on May 7, 1946. The community was previously known as Frederickstown, to honor Holmen's blacksmith Frederick Anderson. The name was changed when Charles A. Sjolander opened the post office in September 1875. The name Holmen is a norwegian word and translates to islet (a small island).

Geography

Holmen contains wooded areas, hills, and bluffs, typical of the Driftless Area, or Coulee Region. The Mississippi River passes just to the southwest of the village.

Holmen is located at  (43.955330, −91.259132). Star Hill is a prominent bluff adjacent to downtown Holmen and is one of the tallest areas of the village. The hill gets its name from a light up star on top of the hill.

Demographics

2010 census
As of the census of 2010, there were 9,005 people, 3,400 households, and 2,431 families residing in the village. The racial makeup of the village was 90.4% White, 0.6% African American, 0.2% Native American, 7.0% Asian, 0.2% from other races, and 1.5% from two or more races. Hispanic or Latino of any race were 1.1% of the population.

There were 3,400 households, of which 41.4% had children under the age of 18 living with them, 55.5% were married couples living together, 10.8% had a female householder with no husband present, 5.2% had a male householder with no wife present, and 28.5% were non-families. 23.1% of all households were made up of individuals, and 8.2% had someone living alone who was 65 years of age or older. The average household size was 2.64 and the average family size was 3.14.

The median age in the village was 34.1 years. 30% of residents were under the age of 18; 6.7% were between the ages of 18 and 24; 30.6% were from 25 to 44; 22.7% were from 45 to 64; and 10.2% were 65 years of age or older. The gender makeup of the village was 48.9% male and 51.1% female.

Education
Holmen is part of the Holmen School District. Secondary education is provided by Holmen High School, Holmen Middle School and four elementary schools. The district's mascot is the Viking.

Notable people

 Jeren Kendall, baseball player for the Los Angeles Dodgers, attended Holmen High School and graduated in 2014
 Valentine S. Keppel, farmer, businessman, and politician, lived in Holmen
 Craig Newsome, Rookie of Year Award Winner, 1995 All-Madden Team, Super Bowl Champion with the Green Bay Packers in 1997. In 1999 he was traded to the San Francisco 49ers. He played in the NFL from 1995–2000

References

External links
 Holmen, Wisconsin
 Holmen Kornfest (Annual festival)
 Holmen Area Historical Society

Villages in La Crosse County, Wisconsin
Villages in Wisconsin